The Grand Lapa Macau is a luxury hotel on Avenida da Amizade in Sé, Macau, China located directly adjacent to the Sands Macao and near the Outer Harbour Ferry Terminal.

The hotel opened in 1984 as the Excelsior and was later renamed the Oriental Hotel and then the Mandarin Oriental, Macau. The hotel was 50% owned by Mandarin Oriental Hotel Group and 50% owned by Stanley Ho's Shun Tak Holdings before being fully purchased in 2009 by another of Ho's companies, Sociedade de Turismo e Diversões de Macau.

The hotel was renamed the Grand Lapa Macau on August 1st, 2009, a year prior to the opening of the new Mandarin Oriental, Macau in One Central. Despite the renaming, the Grand Lapa continued to be operated by Mandarin Oriental through January 2014.

The 435 rooms are decorated with Portuguese fabrics and teakwood furnishings.

References

Hotels in Macau
1984 establishments in Macau
Hotel buildings completed in 1984
Sé, Macau